Willie Walsh may refer to:

 Willie Walsh (bishop), Irish Roman Catholic prelate, Bishop Emeritus of Killaloe
 Willie Walsh (businessman), Irish businessman and director general of the International Air Transport Association (IATA)
 Willie Walsh (hurler, born 1888), Irish former hurler with Sarsfields and Cork
 Willie Walsh (hurler, born 1938), Irish former hurler with St Finbarr's and Cork
 Willie Walsh (hurler, born 1948), Irish former hurler with Youghal and Cork

See also
William Walsh (disambiguation)